"Landslide" is a song recorded by British-Australian singer Olivia Newton-John for her eleventh studio album, Physical (1981). Written and produced by John Farrar, the song was released in several countries as the third and final single in April 1982.

“Landslide" did not achieve the success of its predecessors, but peaked within the top 20 in Belgium and the United Kingdom, peaking at number 18 on the UK Singles Charts. It peaked at number 52 on the US Billboard Hot 100.

Track listing and formats
UK 7-inch vinyl single (EMI Records)
 "Landslide" (Farrar) – 4:27
 "Recovery" (Farrar, Tom Snow) – 4:18

Charts

Weekly charts

References

External links
 "Physical" album at Newton-John's official website

1982 singles
Olivia Newton-John songs
Songs written by John Farrar
Song recordings produced by John Farrar
MCA Records singles
1981 songs